In mathematics, and particularly in the field of complex analysis, the Weierstrass factorization theorem asserts that every entire function can be represented as a (possibly infinite) product involving its zeroes.  The theorem may be viewed as an extension of the fundamental theorem of algebra, which asserts that every polynomial may be factored into linear factors, one for each root.

The theorem, which is named for Karl Weierstrass, is closely related to a second result that every sequence tending to infinity has an associated entire function with zeroes at precisely the points of that sequence.

A generalization of the theorem extends it to meromorphic functions and allows one to consider a given meromorphic function as a product of three factors: terms depending on the function's zeros and poles, and an associated non-zero holomorphic function.

Motivation

The consequences of the fundamental theorem of algebra are twofold.
Firstly, any finite sequence  in the complex plane has an associated polynomial  that has zeroes precisely at the points of that sequence, 

Secondly, any polynomial function  in the complex plane has a factorization 
 

The two forms of the Weierstrass factorization theorem can be thought of as extensions of the above to entire functions. The necessity of additional terms in the product is demonstrated when one considers  where the sequence  is not finite. It can never define an entire function, because the infinite product does not converge. Thus one cannot, in general, define an entire function from a sequence of prescribed zeroes or represent an entire function by its zeroes using the expressions yielded by the fundamental theorem of algebra.

So it stands to reason that one should seek a function that could be 0 at a prescribed point, yet remain near 1 when not at that point and furthermore introduce no more zeroes than those prescribed. 

The elementary factors
Right after , they sharply fall to some small positive value.

The elementary factors, 
also referred to as primary factors'', 
are functions that combine the properties of zero slope and zero value (see graphic):

 and one can read off how those properties are enforced.

The utility of the elementary factors  lies in the following lemma:

The two forms of the theorem

Existence of entire function with specified zeroes
Let  be a sequence of non-zero complex numbers such that .
If  is any sequence of nonnegative integers such that for all ,
 
then the function
 
is entire with zeros only at points .

 The sequence  in the statement of the theorem always exists. For example, we could always take  and have the convergence. Such a sequence is not unique: changing it at finite number of positions, or taking another sequence , will not break the convergence.
 The theorem generalizes to the following: sequences in open subsets (and hence regions) of the Riemann sphere have associated functions that are holomorphic in those subsets and have zeroes at the points of the sequence.
 Also the case given by the fundamental theorem of algebra is incorporated here. If the sequence  is finite then we can take  and obtain: .

The Weierstrass factorization theorem
Then there exists an entire function  and a sequence of integers  such that

Examples of factorization
The trigonometric functions sine and cosine have the factorizations

while the gamma function  has factorization 

 is the Euler–Mascheroni constant. The cosine identity can be seen as special case of

Hadamard factorization theorem
 

See also
 Mittag-Leffler's theorem
 Wallis product, which can be derived from this theorem applied to the sine function
 Blaschke product

Notes

External links
 

 
Theorems in complex analysis